Marble Canyon is a canyon surrounding Tokumm Creek just above its confluence with the Vermilion River, at the north end of Kootenay National Park in the Canadian Rockies of British Columbia, Canada. 
South of Marble Canyon on Highway 93 is Numa Falls on the Vermillion River.

As described by Canadian Alpine Journal in 1913, "[Tokumm Creek] joins Vermillion River through a magnificent gorge, or box canyon, so narrow that at several places the fissure, for it seems little more than a crack in the rock strata, is bridged by great boulders that have become wedged across it. It was a feature well worth seeing."

Cambrian Lagerstatte
A major new find was announced in early 2014 of fossilized Cambrian soft-bodied organisms in or near Marble Canyon that rival or even surpass the nearby Burgess Shale fossil site in size and preservation. The report said that 22% of the observed species found in the initial excavation were new to science. Additionally, several species previously known only from Chinese Lagerstätten, created millions of years earlier, were also found at the site. The exact location of the site was kept confidential to avoid damage to the site.

Species discoveries

Based on Caron et al. (2014) unless otherwise noted. Fossils first described from Marble Canyon are written as bold.
 Cambroraster falcatus
 Titanokorys gainesi
 Hurdia
 Tokummia katalepsis
 Branchiocaris sp.
 Perspicaris
 Fibulacaris nereidis
 Pakucaris apatis
 Balhuticaris voltae
 Tuzoia cf. burgessensis
 Surusicaris elegans
 Yawunik kootenayi
 Alalcomenaeus sp.
 Mollisonia plenovenatrix (=M. symmetrica in Caron et al. 2014)
 Sidneyia inexpectans
 Liangshanella cf. burgessensis
 Naraoia compacta
 Naraoia (Misszhouia) canadensis (=M. cf. longicaudata in Caron et al. 2014)
 Elrathina cf. marginalis
 Bathyuriscus sp.
 Kootenia cf. burgessensis
 Zacanthoides sp.
 Ehmaniella
 Itagnostus interstrictus
 Ptychagnostus cf. praecurrens
 Peronopsis
 Marrella splendens
 Primicaris cf. larvaformis
 Molaria spinifera
 Selkirkia tubes
 Metaspriggina walcotti
 Banffia
 Oesia disjuncta (Margaretia dorus)
 Kootenayscolex barbarensis (=Burgessochaeta cf. setigera in Caron et al. 2014)
 Prototreta n. sp. aff. P. interrupta
 Eoobolus sp.
 Linnarssonia sp.
 Mellopegma sp. aff. M. georginense
 Haplophrentis cf. carinatus

References

Canyons and gorges of British Columbia
Canadian Rockies
East Kootenay
Kootenay National Park